Songs from Dawson's Creek – Volume 2 is the second soundtrack album for the teen drama series Dawson's Creek. Coinciding with television debut of the series's fourth season on The WB, it was released by Columbia Records and Sony Music on October 3, 2000 in the United States. Once again compromising a set of pop rock and folk pop songs, it features appearances by Evan & Jaron, Five for Fighting, The Jayhawks, Train, Wheatus, Jessica Andrews, Shawn Colvin, and Pete Yorn.

Track listing

Charts

References

Dawson's Creek
Television soundtracks
2000 soundtrack albums
Columbia Records soundtracks